Russell Anthony Shorto (born February 8, 1959) is an American author, historian, and journalist who is best known for his book on the Dutch origins of New York City, The Island at the Center of the World. Shorto's research for the book relied greatly on the work of the New Netherland Project, now known as the New Netherland Research Center, as well as the New Netherland Institute. Shorto has been the New Netherland Institute's Senior Scholar since 2013.

In November 2017, he published Revolution Song: A Story of American Freedom, which tells the story of the American Revolution through the eyes of six Americans from vastly different walks of life.

His most recent work is Smalltime: The Story of My Family and the Mob, published in February 2021. The book is a memoir, covering Shorto's own family history and his ancestors involvement in the American Mafia in Johnstown, Pennsylvania.

In 2022, Shorto founded, and became Director of, the New Amsterdam Project at the New-York Historical Society, with a mission to promote awareness of New York's Dutch origins.

Personal life
Born in Johnstown, Pennsylvania, on February 8, 1959, Shorto is a 1981 graduate of George Washington University. As of 2014, Shorto resided in Cumberland, Maryland, where he wrote Revolution Song, his narrative history of the American Revolution.

On September 8, 2009, Shorto received a Dutch knighthood in the Order of Orange-Nassau for strengthening Netherlands-United States relations through his publications and as director of the John Adams Institute.

In 2018, Shorto was inducted into the New York State Writers Hall of Fame. 

He is married to Pamela Twigg.

Bibliography

Books
 Gospel Truth: The New Image of Jesus Emerging from Science and History, and Why It Matters  (New York, Riverhead Books, 1997)
 Saints and Madmen: How Pioneering Psychiatrists Are Creating a New Science of the Soul  (New York, Henry Holt & Company, 1999)
 The Island at the Center of the World: The Epic Story of Dutch Manhattan and the Forgotten Colony that Shaped America  (New York, Doubleday, 2004)
 Descartes' Bones: A Skeletal History of the Conflict Between Faith and Reason  (New York, Random House, October 14, 2008)
 Amsterdam: A History of the World's Most Liberal City   (New York, Doubleday, October 2013)
 Revolution Song: A Story of American Freedom  (New York, W. W. Norton & Company, November 7, 2017)
 Smalltime: A Story of My Family and the Mob ISBN 978-1324020172 (New York, W.W. Norton & Company, February 2021)

References

External links

1959 births
Living people
21st-century American historians
American male journalists
Critics of the Christ myth theory
Historians of the Netherlands
Historians of New York City
Knights of the Order of Orange-Nassau
George Washington University alumni
American expatriates in the Netherlands
21st-century American journalists
21st-century American male writers
People from Cumberland, Maryland
20th-century American non-fiction writers
20th-century American male writers
People from Johnstown, Pennsylvania
Journalists from Maryland
Journalists from Pennsylvania
Historians from Maryland
Historians from Pennsylvania